{{Infobox person
| name        = Kōno Hironaka'河野広中
| image       = Hironaka kohno.jpg
| alt         =
| caption     =
| birth_date  =  
| birth_place = Mutsu Province, Japan
| death_date  =  
| death_place =
| nationality = Japanese
| other_names =
| known_for   =
| occupation  = politician, cabinet minister
}}

 was a politician and cabinet minister in the  Empire of Japan.

Biography
Kōno was a native of Mutsu Province (modern-day Fukushima Prefecture), where his father, Iwamura Hidetoshi, was a samurai in the service of Miharu Domain, who supplemented his 100 koku income through trade in clothes, sake brewing and wholesale of marine products.  Kōno was sent to Edo for studies in Confucianism and was drawn into the sonnō jōi movement. During the Boshin War, he fought against his family, whose Miharu Domain remained loyal to the Tokugawa shogunate and which was a member of the Ōuetsu Reppan Dōmei. Following the Meiji restoration, he served as an administrator in many locations in northern Japan for the new Meiji government, and became associated with Itagaki Taisuke and the Freedom and People's Rights Movement. With the Satsuma Rebellion, Kōno resisted attempts to recruit him to the side of Saigō Takamori, but instead joined Itagaki in forming the Aikokusha movement, pushing for the creation of a national assembly. He was one of the founding members of the Jiyūtō political party in 1881. He was leader of the Jiyūtō in Fukushima Prefecture from 1882–1883, during the time of the Fukushima Incident of 1882, when conservative forces within the government sought to curb the growing power of the Jiyūtō through illegal means.

Kōno won a seat in the Lower House of the Diet of Japan in the 1890 General Election, and was subsequently reelected fourteen consecutive times to the same seat through the 1920 General Election . In 1898, he became a member of the Kenseitō. Over the course of his career, he migrated from the Rikken Seiyūkai to the Rikken Kokumintō to the Rikken Dōshikai and finally to the Kenseikai''.

Kōno was briefly (for a six-day period) Speaker of the Lower House in December 1903, causing an uproar for calling for the impeachment of Prime Minister Katsura Tarō during his inaugural speech in front of Emperor Meiji.

In 1909, he supported the Pan-Asian Movement creating a group dedicated to the liberation of Asia from Western colonialism. From 1915-1916, Kōno was appointed Ministry of Agriculture and Commerce under the Ōkuma Shigenobu administration. Kōno died in 1923 at age74 and his grave is located at the temple of Gokoku-ji in Bunkyo, Tokyo.

References

1844 births
1923 deaths
Samurai
Politicians from Fukushima Prefecture
Government ministers of Japan
Members of the House of Representatives (Empire of Japan)
People of the Boshin War
Liberal Party (Japan, 1881) politicians
Kenseikai politicians
Rikken Dōshikai politicians
Rikken Kokumintō politicians
Rikken Seiyūkai politicians
Kenseitō politicians